The Chop Bar is a Ghanaian food centre that serves local cuisines in a contemporary dining setting. It was founded by Elias Hage and Mona Quartey El Halabi in 2015

Service 
It currently has two branches, located at the Achimota Retail Centre and A&C Mall in Accra. Dishes serve are similar to that of local Chop Bar, but dishes are served in a contemporary environment. The eatery in partnership with digital online food shops like "Jumia Food" and "Eziban Food" provides digital service.

Menu 
The Chop Bar serves mainly local dishes.

 Waakye with Fish and Wele / beef and Egg
 Vegetable Rice with  beef and sausage / chicken and sausage
 Assorted Jollof Rice with  beef and sausage / chicken and sausage
 Jollof Rice with Fried fish / Grilled Chicken
 Fried Rice with Fried fish / Grilled Chicken
 Red Red with fish/ beef/chicken and fried/boiled plantain
 Banku with Tilapia and red pepper / Okro Stew / Groundnut Soup / Light Soup / Palm-nut Soup
 Boiled Yam with Kontomire stew / Garden eggs stew / Goat Stew
 Boiled Plantain with Kontomire stew / Garden eggs stew / Goat stew
 Steamed rice with Kontomire stew / Garden eggs stew / Goat stew
 Fufu with Groundnut Soup / Light Soup / Palmnut Soup / Ebunuebunu / Abekati / Katikonto / Abekatikonto
 Omotuo with Groundnut Soup / Palm-nut Soup

See also 

 Ghanaian Cuisines
 Chop Bar

References

External links 
 The Chop Bar Website
 The Chop Bar Facebook Page

Fast-food restaurants